Johnson is an unincorporated community in Whitman County, in the U.S. state of Washington.

History
A post office called Johnson was established in 1888, and remained in operation until 1956. The community was named after Jonathan Johnson, the original owner of the town site.

References

Unincorporated communities in Whitman County, Washington
Unincorporated communities in Washington (state)